Eibar is a city and municipality within the province of Gipuzkoa, in the Basque Country of Spain. It is the head town of Debabarrena, one of the eskualde / comarca of Gipuzkoa.

Eibar has 27,138 inhabitants (Eustat, 2018). Its chief industry is metal manufacturing, and has been known since the 16th century for the manufacture of armaments, particularly finely engraved small arms. It was also the home of Serveta scooters.

It is home to the SD Eibar football team.

Geography 
Eibar lies at an altitude of 121m above sea level, in the west of the province of Gipuzkoa, right next to Biscay. Eibar has an oceanic climate. The town lies in a narrow valley in a mountainous area, the highest mountains are between 700 and 800 metres high. Eibar is traversed by river Ego, which is a tributary of the Deba.

Apart from the urban area, the municipality consists of five rural neighbourhoods: Otaola-Kinarraga, Aginaga, Arrate, Mandiola and Gorosta.

History 
The city was chartered by Alfonso XI of Castile in 1346, receiving the name of Villanueva de San Andrés de Heybar.

The feudal families that dominated the territory engaged in the War of the Bands. Eibar, like the rest of settlements in the valley, had an industry based on finery forges and the manufacture of arms. In 1766, Eibar got engaged in a social revolt known as the Machinada, and years later, in 1794, it was attacked by the French, who destroyed the town.

In the 19th century, industrialisation transformed the production systems in the city and was accompanied by an important social movement. In the Carlist Wars, Eibar sided with the Liberals. Labour movement and socialism became particularly strong in Eibar. In 1931, Eibar was the first city in Spain to proclaim the Second Spanish Republic; in recognition it was given the title of "Very Exemplary City".

In the Spanish Civil War, Eibar was practically destroyed by Italian bombers aiding the Fascist. The rebuilding brought important industrial development and a demographic increase, as Eibar reached nearly 40,000 inhabitants in a few years.

Due to the lack of space for enlargements, several factories moved to Durangaldea and Álava. The industrial crisis in the 1980s also made Eibar lose a great part of its population.

At the beginning of the 21st century, Eibar's economy is based on industry and services.

Main sights 
Church of San Andrés, built during the 16th and 17th centuries, it has a Gothic style with Renaissance and Baroque elements.
Sanctuary of the Virgin of Arrate, from the beginning of the 17th century.
Hermitage of Azitain, it contains an odd 17th-century beardless Christ.
Palace of Unzueta, from the 17th century.
Palace of Aldatze, from the 17th century.
Palace of Markeskua, from the 16th century.
City Hall, built in concrete over the river Ego, designed by architect Ramón Cortázar and inaugurated on 14 September 1901.
Coliseo Theatre, inaugurated in 1947 and refurbished in 2007.

Transport 
Road
Eibar is traversed by the AP-8 motorway connecting Bilbao and the French border, and the N-634 road running parallel to it. The AP-1 motorway connects Eibar and Vitoria-Gasteiz. AP-8 and AP-1 meet at the Maltzaga motorway junction located in the east of Eibar.

Regular and frequent bus services under Lurraldebus connect Eibar to neighbouring towns, San Sebastián, Vitoria-Gasteiz and Bilbao Airport. BizkaiBus provides regular and frequent bus services to and from Bilbao. ALSA runs a daily service to and from Madrid-Barajas Airport and Madrid.

Eibar also has an urban bus service called Udalbus.

Railway

Eibar is located on the Bilbao-San Sebastián narrow gauge railway line. Trains operated by Euskotren run frequently and regularly to Bilbao-Matiko station and Donostia-Amara station. Services are more frequent in the Ermua-Eibar-Elgoibar section.

There are five stations in Eibar, from west to east: Unibertsitatea-Eibar, Amaña-Eibar, Ardantza-Eibar, Eibar and Azitain-Eibar.

Education 
The Gipuzkoa Faculty of Engineering of the University of the Basque Country has a section in Eibar. The section offers an undergraduate program in renewable energy engineering.

The Escuela de Armería, founded in 1913, is the oldest vocational training school in Spain.

Sport

Football
Eibar is home to SD Eibar, which earned promotion to La Liga in the 2013-14 season. After seven seasons in the top division, it was relegated to Segunda División in the 2021–21 season. The team plays at the Ipurua Municipal Stadium. 

The women's section of SD Eibar was granted promotion to Primera División in the 2019–20 season. After two seasons in the top division, it was relegated to Primera Federación in the 2021–22 season. The team plays at the Unbe Sports Complex.

Basque pelota
The Astelena fronton, nicknamed the Cathedral of Basque Hand-pelota, is a regular venue of the hand-pelota professional circuit competitions the Bare-handed Pelota First League, the Bare-handed Pelota First League Doubles and the Cuatro y Medio Euskadi Championship.

Cycling
Since 2009, the city hosts an annual stage finish in the Tour of Basque Country, usually after the riders have climbed the Alto de Arrate. Before 2009, this was a traditional finish in the Euskal Bizikleta, which originated in Eibar as Bicicleta Eibarresa. The Arrate-finish has also been included in the Vuelta a España in 1972, 1974, 2012 and 2020.

Notable people
 Francisco de Ibarra (1539–1575), explorer and conqueror
 Martín Ignacio de Loyola (1550–1606), missionary and navigator
 Ignacio de Soroeta (?–17??), Governor of Paraguay
 Juan Antonio Mogel (1745–1804), writer
 Plácido Zuloaga (1834–1910), sculptor and metalworker
 Ignacio Zuloaga (1870–1945), painter
 Ciriaco Errasti (1904–1984), footballer
 Baltasar Albéniz (1905–1978), football manager
 Roberto Etxebarria Arruti (1908–1981), footballer
 Víctor Lecumberri (1913–2005) was a Spanish politician
 Miguel Gallastegui (1918–2019), Basque pelotari
 Alicia Iturrioz (1927–2021), painter
 Alberto Ormaetxea (1939–2005), footballer and football manager
 Luis Aranberri (1945–), politician and journalist
 Javier Aguirresarobe (1948–), cinematographer
 Koldo Zuazo (1956–), linguist
 Enrique Zuazua (1961–), mathematician
 Maite Zúñiga (1964–), athlete
 Pedro Horrillo (1974–), cyclist
 Patxi Usobiaga (1980–), climber
 Markel Susaeta (1987–), footballer
 Jon Errasti (1988–), footballer
 Markel Alberdi (1991–), swimmer
 Mikel Oyarzabal (1997–), footballer
 Odei Jainaga (1997–), athlete

See also
Armas Ugartechea

References

External links

 Official website
 eibar.org
 Eibar's pages
 EIBAR in the Bernardo Estornés Lasa - Auñamendi Encyclopedia (Euskomedia Fundazioa) 

 
Articles containing video clips